Kunratice may refer to places in the Czech Republic:

Kunratice (Děčín District), a municipality and village in the Ústí nad Labem Region
Kunratice (Liberec District), a municipality and village in the Liberec Region
Kunratice (Prague), a district of Prague
Kunratice u Cvikova, a municipality and village in the Liberec Region
Kunratice, a city part of Liberec in the Liberec Region
Kunratice, a village and part of Šluknov in the Ústí nad Labem Region